The 2019–20 Arizona State Sun Devils men's ice hockey season was the 5th season of play for the program at the Division I level. The Sun Devils represented Arizona State University and were coached by Greg Powers, in his 10th season.

Departures

Recruiting

Roster

As of December 20, 2019.

|}

Standings

Schedule and Results

|-
!colspan=12 style=";" | Regular Season

Scoring Statistics

Goaltending statistics

Rankings

References

Arizona State Sun Devils men's ice hockey seasons
Arizona State Sun Devils
Arizona State Sun Devils
2019 in sports in Arizona
2020 in sports in Arizona